Land of Enchantment is the fifteenth studio album by American singer-songwriter Michael Martin Murphey. The album reached number 33 on the Billboard Top Country Albums chart.

Track listing

Personnel
Music
 Michael Martin Murphey – vocals, guitar, piano, harmonica, concept
 Steve Gibson – arranger, dobro, guitar, mandolin, backing vocals, producer
 Mark Casstevens – banjo, guitar
 Sonny Garrish – steel guitar
 Jerry Douglas – dobro
 David Hoffner – piano, synthesizer
 Joey Miskulin – accordion
 Mark O'Connor – fiddle
 Stuart Duncan – fiddle
 Herbert Hester – fiddle
 Bill Miller – flute
 Dennis Burnside – piano, synthesizer
 Charlie McCoy – harmonica
 Roy M. "Junior" Huskey – bass
 Craig Nelson – bass
 Eddie Bayers – drums
 Farrell Morris – percussion
 Jim Photoglo – backing vocals
 John Wesley Ryles – backing vocals
 Ricky Skaggs – backing vocals
 Harry Stinson – backing vocals
 Gary Janney – backing vocals
 Curtis Young – backing vocals
 Dennis Wilson – backing vocals

Production
 Jim Ed Norman – producer
 Rich Schirmer – engineer
 Keith Compton – engineer
 Carry Summers – assistant engineer
 Steve Bishir – assistant engineer
 Jeanne Kinney – assistant engineer
 Marshall Morgan – engineer, mixing
 Warren Peterson – engineer, assistant engineer
 Denny Purcell – mastering
 Carl Marsh – arranger, synthesizer, fairlight
 Danny Kee – production assistant
 Laura LiPuma – art direction, design, concept

Chart performance

References

External links
 Michael Martin Murphey's Official Website

1989 albums
Michael Martin Murphey albums
Warner Records albums
Albums produced by Jim Ed Norman